Kathryn Nance North  is a paediatric physician, neurologist, and clinical geneticist. In 2013, she was appointed Director of the Murdoch Childrens Research Institute and was named the David Danks Professor of Child Health Research at the University of Melbourne. In 2012, North was appointed Chair of the National Health and Medical Research Council Research Committee. In 2014, she was appointed Vice Chair of the Global Alliance for Genomics and Health (GA4GH) and Co-Chair of its Clinical Working Group.

North received a doctorate in neurogenetics in 1994 from University of Sydney and later completed a postdoctoral fellowship in the Genetics Program at Harvard Medical School. North's laboratory research is focused on the molecular and genetic basis of inherited muscle disorders including muscular dystrophies and congenital myopathies, and of elite athletic performance. Her clinical research is focused on cognitive deficits in neurofibromatosis type 1 and intervention strategies for children with learning disabilities and inherited myopathies.

Awards
 The Sunderland Award from the Australian Neuroscience Society (2000)
 The Sutherland Lecturership by the Human Genetics Society of Australasia (2008)
 The Glaxo Smith Kline Australia Award for Research Excellence (2011)
 The Ramaciotti Medal  for Excellence in Biomedical Research (2012)
 Member of the Order of Australia (AM) for service to medicine in the field of neuromuscular and neurogenetics research for "service to medicine in the field of neuromuscular and neurogenetics research, paediatrics and child health as a clinician and academic, and to national and international professional associations." (2012)
 Foundation fellow of the Australian Academy of Health and Medical Science (2014)
Doctor of Medical Science honoris causa (2017) from the University of Melbourne.
 Companion of the Order of Australia (AC) (2019) for "eminent service to genomic medicine nationally and internationally, to medical research  in  the  fields  of  genetics, neurology and child  health, and as a mentor and role model."
 Peter Wills Medal from Research Australia (2019), "recognising an outstanding, long-term contribution to building Australia’s international reputation in areas of health and medical research and fostering collaboration for better health."

References

External links 
 Australasian Neuroscience Society
 Human Genetics Society of Australasia

Australian neurologists
Women neurologists
Australian paediatricians
Women pediatricians
Australian geneticists
Living people
Members of the Order of Australia
Companions of the Order of Australia
Academic staff of the University of Melbourne
University of Melbourne women
University of Sydney alumni
Australian medical researchers
Medical geneticists
Australian clinical geneticists
Fellows of the Australian Academy of Health and Medical Sciences
Year of birth missing (living people)